Abacetus parvulus is a species of ground beetle in the subfamily Pterostichinae. It was described by Johann Christoph Friedrich Klug in 1853.

Abacetus is a single European species belongs to the beetle genus which is found in Africa, Asia, and Australia.

Taxonomy (GBIF) 
Kingdom: Animalia 

Phylum: Arthropoda 

Class: Insecta 

Family : Carabidae

References 

parvulus
Beetles described in 1853